Abu Jafar Mohammad Moinuddin is a Awami League politician and the former member of parliament for Comilla-22. His daughter, Nurjahan Begum Mukta, was elected to parliament in 2018.

Career
Moinuddin was elected to parliament from Comilla-22 as an Awami League candidate in 1973.

References

Awami League politicians
Living people
1st Jatiya Sangsad members
Year of birth missing (living people)